Anthony John Mitchell (born 7 September 1956 in Redruth, Cornwall) is an English former professional footballer who played in the Football League as a right back.

References

1956 births
Living people
People from Redruth
English footballers
Association football defenders
Leatherhead F.C. players
Exeter City F.C. players
Sutton United F.C. players
English Football League players